This is a list of notable events in country music that took place in the year 1981.

Events
March 14 — The final showing of Live From The Grand Ole Opry on the Public Broadcasting System (PBS) occurs on this night. The show actually went beyond the televised segment, but the show was ended with a clip of Marty Robbins singing "El Paso" (a song he used to close out his Opry segment at midnight) from the year before. Because of cost over-runs and other technicalities, this was the final run for the annual show on PBS that featured the music of Tom T. Hall, Del Reeves, Hank Snow, Roy Acuff and Minnie Pearl, and many other performers.
 October — The Weekly Country Music Countdown, a three-hour weekly countdown program, debuts. The syndicated program, hosted by radio personality Chris Charles, features the top 30 country hits of the week as reported by Radio & Records magazine. The program is a success and the first country music-oriented countdown program to successfully rival the 8-year-old American Country Countdown show.

No dates
The Smithsonian Collection of Classic Country Music, an eight-volume, 143-track collection, is released. The box set is considered one of the first important retrospectives of the genre and contains extensive liner notes, depicting the importance of each song or artist included. Songs included range from 1922's "Sally Gooden" to 1975's "Blue Eyes Crying in the Rain" by Willie Nelson. Specifically, each volume is titled as follows: "1920's," "1930's Southeast," "1930's Southwest," "1941–1953" (two records), "1953–1963," "Bluegrass" and "1963–1975."
 Also during the year, the Franklin Mint, as part of its volume series of significant musical recordings, begins issuing a series of country music-focused two-record sets. "The Greatest Country Music Recordings of All Time" will eventually spawn 50 different album sets through 1986 (each new volume issued roughly every other month), with each two-album set focusing on a different era, performer or style, topic and so forth, and each volume will have extensive liner notes and vintage photographs.

Top hits of the year

Singles released by American artists

Singles released by Canadian artists

Top new album releases

{| class="wikitable sortable"
|-
! US
! Album
! Artist
! Record Label
|-
| align="center"| 4
| Barbara Mandrell Live
| Barbara Mandrell
| MCA
|-
| align="center"| 24
| The Baron
| Johnny Cash
| Columbia
|-
| align="center"| 9
| Bet Your Heart on Me
| Johnny Lee
| Full Moon
|-
| align="center"| 3
| Big City
| Merle Haggard
| Epic
|-
| align="center"| 6
| Carryin' on the Family Names
| David Frizzell & Shelly West
| Warner Bros./Viva
|-
| align="center"| 10
| Christmas
| Kenny Rogers
| Liberty
|-
| align="center"| 6
| Cimarron
| Emmylou Harris
| Warner Bros.
|-
| align="center"| 19
| ''Darlin| Tom Jones
| Mercury
|-
| align="center"| 10
| Drifter
| Sylvia
| RCA
|-
| align="center"| 5
| Especially for You
| Don Williams
| MCA
|-
| align="center"| 5
| Evangeline
| Emmylou Harris
| Warner Bros.
|-
| align="center"| 1
| Fancy Free
| The Oak Ridge Boys
| MCA
|-
| align="center"| 1
| Feels So Right
| Alabama
| RCA
|-
| align="center"| 19
| Fire & Smoke
| Earl Thomas Conley
| RCA
|-
| align="center"| 6
| Good Time Lovin' Man
| Ronnie McDowell
| Epic
|-
| align="center"| 8
| Greatest Hits
| Charley Pride
| RCA
|-
| align="center"| 8
| Greatest Hits
| Jim Reeves & Patsy Cline
| RCA
|-
| align="center"| 1
| Greatest Hits (& Some That Will Be)
| Willie Nelson
| Columbia
|-
| align="center"| 6
| Guitar Man
| Elvis Presley
| RCA
|-
| align="center"| 23
| Hey Joe! Hey Moe!
| Moe Bandy & Joe Stampley
| Columbia
|-
| align="center"| 5
| Hollywood, Tennessee
| Crystal Gayle
| Columbia
|-
| align="center"| 7
| I Love 'Em All
| T. G. Sheppard
| Warner Bros./Curb
|-
| align="center"| 24
| I'm Countryfied
| Mel McDaniel
| Capitol
|-
| align="center"| 25
| John Anderson 2
| John Anderson
| Warner Bros.
|-
| align="center"| 4
| Juice
| Juice Newton
| Capitol
|-
| align="center"| 11
| Leather and Lace
| Waylon Jennings & Jessi Colter
| RCA
|-
| align="center"| 8
| Makin' Friends
| Razzy Bailey
| RCA
|-
| align="center"| 20
| Me and My R.C.
| Louise Mandrell & R. C. Bannon
| RCA
|-
| align="center"| 19
| Midnight Crazy
| Mac Davis
| Casablanca
|-
| align="center"| 5
| Mr. T
| Conway Twitty
| MCA
|-
| align="center"| 10
| Not Guilty
| Larry Gatlin and the Gatlin Brothers
| Columbia
|-
| align="center"| 8
| Now or Never
| John Schneider
| Scotti Brothers
|-
| align="center"| 6
| Out Where the Bright Lights Are Glowing
| Ronnie Milsap
| RCA
|-
| align="center"| 5
| The Pressure Is On
| Hank Williams, Jr.
| Elektra/Curb
|-
| align="center"| 20
| Rainbow Stew: Live at Anaheim Stadium
| Merle Haggard
| MCA
|-
| align="center"| 17
| Roll On Mississippi
| Charley Pride
| RCA
|-
| align="center"| 2
| Rowdy
| Hank Williams Jr.
| Elektra/Curb
|-
| align="center"| 1
| Seven Year Ache
| Rosanne Cash
| Columbia
|-
| align="center"| 1
| Share Your Love
| Kenny Rogers
| Liberty
|-
| align="center"| 7
| Some Days Are Diamonds
| John Denver
| RCA
|-
| align="center"| 6
| Somebody's Knockin| Terri Gibbs
| MCA
|-
| align="center"| 1
| Somewhere Over the Rainbow
| Willie Nelson
| Columbia
|-
| align="center"| 1
| Step by Step
| Eddie Rabbitt
| Elektra
|-
| align="center"| 3
| Still the Same Ole Me
| George Jones
| Epic
|-
| align="center"| 9
| Surround Me with Love
| Charly McClain
| Epic
|-
| align="center"| 12
| Takin' It Easy
| Lacy J. Dalton
| Columbia
|-
| align="center"| 1
| There's No Gettin' Over Me
| Ronnie Milsap
| RCA
|-
| align="center"| 17
| Town & Country
| Ray Price
| Dimension
|-
| align="center"| 23
| Urban Chipmunk
| The Chipmunks
| RCA
|-
| align="center"| 2
| Waitin' for the Sun to Shine
| Ricky Skaggs
| Epic
|-
| align="center"| 4
| Where Do You Go When You Dream
| Anne Murray
| Capitol
|-
| align="center"| 22
| With Love
| John Conlee
| MCA
|-
| align="center"| 5
| Wild West
| Dottie West
| Liberty
|-
| align="center"| 9
| Years Ago
| The Statler Brothers
| Mercury
|-
| align="center"| 19
| You Don't Know Me
| Mickey Gilley
| Epic
|}

Other top albums
{| class="wikitable sortable"
|-
! US
! Album
! Artist
! Record Label
|-
| align="center"| 43
| As Is
| Bobby Bare
| Columbia
|-
| align="center"| 59
| Ask Any Woman
| Con Hunley
| Warner Bros.
|-
| align="center"| 49
| The Best of Jerry Lee Lewis
| Jerry Lee Lewis
| Elektra
|-
| align="center"| 38
| Between This Time and the Next Time
| Gene Watson
| MCA
|-
| align="center"| 54
| Bobby Goldsboro
| Bobby Goldsboro
| Curb
|-
| align="center"| 41
| Christmas Country
| Various Artists
| Elektra
|-
| align="center"| 34
| Christmas at Gilley's
| Mickey Gilley
| Epic
|-
| align="center"| 34
| Christmas Wishes
| Anne Murray
| Capitol
|-
| align="center"| 52
| Concrete Cowboys
| The Concrete Cowboys Band
| Excelsoir
|-
| align="center"| 45
| Dakota
| Stephanie Winslow
| Warner Bros./Curb
|-
| align="center"| 26
| Desperate Dreams
| Eddy Raven
| Elektra
|-
| align="center"| 47
| Elvis-Greatest Hits, Volume One
| Elvis Presley
| RCA
|-
| align="center"| 43
| Encore
| George Jones
| Epic
|-
| align="center"| 52
| Encore
| Charly McClain
| Epic
|-
| align="center"| 44
| Encore
| Tammy Wynette
| Epic
|-
| align="center"| 43
| Fragile – Handle with Care
| Cristy Lane
| Liberty
|-
| align="center"| 47
| Greatest Hits
| Jim Ed Brown & Helen Cornelius
| RCA
|-
| align="center"| 35
| Greatest Hits
| Dave & Sugar
| RCA
|-
| align="center"| 42
| Heart to Heart
| Reba McEntire
| Mercury
|-
| align="center"| 43
| High Time
| Dottie West
| Liberty
|-
| align="center"| 30
| Hurricane
| Leon Everette
| RCA
|-
| align="center"| 28
| I Ain't Honky Tonkin' No More
| Joe Sun
| Elektra
|-
| align="center"| 35
| I Have a Dream
| Cristy Lane
| Liberty
|-
| align="center"| 40
| I Just Came Home to Count the Memories
| John Anderson
| Warner Bros.
|-
| align="center"| 33
| I Lie
| Loretta Lynn
| MCA
|-
| align="center"| 40
| I'm a Lady
| Terri Gibbs
| MCA
|-
| align="center"| 33
| I'm Gonna Love You Back to Loving Me Again
| Joe Stampley
| Epic
|-
| align="center"| 56
| If I Keep On Going Crazy
| Leon Everette
| RCA
|-
| align="center"| 67
| Invictus (Means) Unconquered
| David Allan Coe
| Columbia
|-
| align="center"| 49
| It's the World Gone Crazy
| Glen Campbell
| Capitol
|-
| align="center"| 52
| Just Like Me
| Terry Gregory
| Handshake
|-
| align="center"| 54
| King of the Road
| Boxcar Willie
| Main Street
|-
| align="center"| 42
| ''Lettin' You In on a Feelin
| The Kendalls
| Mercury
|-
| align="center"| 30
| Live!| Hoyt Axton
| Jeremiah
|-
| align="center"| 36
| Lovin' Her Was Easier| Tompall & the Glaser Brothers
| Elektra
|-
| align="center"| 56
| Mel & Nancy| Mel Tillis & Nancy Sinatra
| Elektra
|-
| align="center"| 39
| Minstrel Man| Willie Nelson
| RCA
|-
| align="center"| 43
| More Good 'Uns| Jerry Clower
| MCA
|-
| align="center"| 40
| Mr. Hag Told My Story| Johnny Paycheck
| Columbia
|-
| align="center"| 42
| Mundo Earwood| Mundo Earwood
| Excelsoir
|-
| align="center"| 64
| My Turn| Donna Hazard
| Excelsoir
|-
| align="center"| 33
| The Night the Lights Went Out in Georgia (Soundtrack)| Various Artists
| Mirage
|-
| align="center"| 57
| Old Loves Never Die| Gene Watson
| MCA
|-
| align="center"| 50
| Once You Were Mine| Dottie West
| RCA
|-
| align="center"| 29
| One to One| Ed Bruce
| MCA
|-
| align="center"| 31
| Pleasure| Dave Rowland & Sugar
| Elektra
|-
| align="center"| 48
| Rodeo Romeo| Moe Bandy
| Columbia
|-
| align="center"| 47
| Rodney Crowell| Rodney Crowell
| Warner Bros.
|-
| align="center"| 49
| Savin' It Up| Debby Boone
| Warner Bros./Curb
|-
| align="center"| 48
| Should I Do It| Tanya Tucker
| MCA
|-
| align="center"| 42
| Sleeping with Your Memory| Janie Fricke
| Columbia
|-
| align="center"| 46
| Songs for the Mama That Tried| Merle Haggard
| MCA
|-
| align="center"| 26
| Strait Country| George Strait
| MCA
|-
| align="center"| 33
| Take This Job and Shove It! (Soundtrack)| Various Artists
| Epic
|-
| align="center"| 59
| A Tribute to Kris| Ray Price
| Columbia
|-
| align="center"| 28
| Two's a Party| Conway Twitty & Loretta Lynn
| MCA
|-
| align="center"| 30
| Urban Cowboy II (Soundtrack)| Various Artists
| Full Moon
|-
| align="center"| 38
| Wasn't That a Party| The Rovers
| Cleveland Int'l.
|-
| align="center"| 39
| White Christmas| John Schneider
| Scotti Brothers
|-
| align="center"| 40
| A Woman's Heart| Crystal Gayle
| Liberty
|}

On television

Regular series
 Barbara Mandrell and the Mandrell Sisters (1980–1982, NBC)
 Hee Haw (1969–1993, syndicated)
 Pop! Goes the Country (1974–1982, syndicated)
 The Porter Wagoner Show (1960–1981, syndicated)
 That Nashville Music (1970–1985, syndicated)

Specials
 June — Country Top 20 – Host Dennis Weaver presented the top 20 songs from January–June 1981. Performances from Alabama, The Gatlin Brothers, The Oak Ridge Boys, John Schneider, T. G. Sheppard, Dottie West and Shelly West. (syndicated)
 October — Country Galaxy of Stars – A two-hour special featuring performances by country music's top stars. (syndicated)
 December — Country Top 20 – A review of the top 20 songs from July–December 1981, with hosts Charly McClain and Roger Miller. Performers included John Conlee, Gail Davies, Crystal Gayle, Johnny Lee, Eddie Rabbitt, Eddy Raven, Joe Stampley, Sylvia and Hank Williams, Jr. (syndicated)

Births
 March 23 — Brett Young, country pop singer. Best known for his string of hits in the mid-to-late 2010s.
 August 28 — Jake Owen, singer-songwriter of the 2000s.
 September 4 — Tom Gossin, member of Gloriana.
 September 11 — Charles Kelley, member of Lady Antebellum.
 December 4 — Lila McCann, teenage singer of the 1990s.

Deaths
January 31 – Scotty (born Scott Greene Wiseman), 72, one-half of the 1930s–1940s husband-and-wife duo Lulu Belle and Scotty.

November 24 – Mother of Country Legends Loretta Lynn and Crystal Gayle dies at a Nashville hospital aged 69.

Country Music Hall of Fame Inductees
Vernon Dalhart (1883–1948)
Grant Turner (1912–1991)

Major awards

Grammy Awards
Best Female Country Vocal Performance — "9 to 5", Dolly Parton
Best Male Country Vocal Performance — "(There's) No Gettin' Over Me", Ronnie Milsap
Best Country Performance by a Duo or Group with Vocal — "Elvira", The Oak Ridge Boys
Best Country Instrumental Performance — "Country After All These Years", Chet Atkins
Best Country Song — "9 to 5", Dolly Parton (Performer: Dolly Parton)

Juno Awards
Country Male Vocalist of the Year — Eddie Eastman
Country Female Vocalist of the Year — Anne Murray
Country Group or Duo of the Year — The Good Brothers

Academy of Country Music
Entertainer of the Year — Alabama
Song of the Year — "You're the Reason God Made Oklahoma", Felice Bryant, Boudleaux Bryant, Larry Collins, Sandy Pinkard (Performer: David Frizzell and Shelly West)
Single of the Year — "Elvira", The Oak Ridge Boys
Album of the Year — Feels So Right, Alabama
Top Male Vocalist — Merle Haggard
Top Female Vocalist — Barbara Mandrell
Top Vocal Duo — David Frizzell and Shelly West
Top New Male Vocalist — Ricky Skaggs
Top New Female Vocalist — Juice Newton

Country Music Association
Entertainer of the Year — Barbara Mandrell
Song of the Year — "He Stopped Loving Her Today", Bobby Braddock and Curly Putman (Performer: George Jones)
Single of the Year — "Elvira", The Oak Ridge Boys
Album of the Year — I Believe in You'', Don WilliamsMale Vocalist of the Year — George JonesFemale Vocalist of the Year — Barbara MandrellVocal Duo of the Year — David Frizzell and Shelly WestVocal Group of the Year — AlabamaHorizon Award — Terri GibbsInstrumentalist of the Year — Chet AtkinsInstrumental Group of the Year''' — Alabama

Further reading
Kingsbury, Paul, "The Grand Ole Opry: History of Country Music. 70 Years of the Songs, the Stars and the Stories," Villard Books, Random House; Opryland USA, 1995
Kingsbury, Paul, "Vinyl Hayride: Country Music Album Covers 1947–1989," Country Music Foundation, 2003
Millard, Bob, "Country Music: 70 Years of America's Favorite Music," HarperCollins, New York, 1993
Whitburn, Joel, "Top Country Songs 1944–2005 – 6th Edition." 2005.

Other links
Country Music Association
Inductees of the Country Music Hall of Fame

External links
Country Music Hall of Fame

Country
Country music by year